Mictocommosis godmani is a species of moth of the family Tortricidae. It is found in Tabasco, Mexico.

References

Moths described in 1914
Mictocommosis